The α850 (DSLR-A850) was Sony's second full-frame digital SLR, introduced on 27 August 2009.  Similar to the DSLR-A900, the camera featured the same 24.6-megapixel full-frame CMOS sensor used in the a900. On 8 June 2011, Sony pre-announced the camera's end of production in July/August 2011.

The camera was almost exactly the same as the DSLR-A900, but the viewfinder coverage was dropped to 98% with 0.74× magnification and the burst rate was reduced to 3 frames per second.

Notes

References

Reviews
 Review by Digital Photography Review

External links

Sony press release

850
Full-frame DSLR cameras